R69 may refer to:
 (R)-69, a drug
 R69 (South Africa), a road
 BMW R69, a motorcycle
 , a destroyer of the Royal Navy
 Small nucleolar RNA Z157/R69/R10